() is one of the original traditional dances from Bondowoso regency, East Java, Indonesia. The dance is played by two people in a lion-like costume (called Singo) and accompanied by music.

Introduction

Singo Ulung is a masked dance arts using barongan, which is the traditional art of Bondowoso regency that usually performed at the annual anniversary of Bondowoso. After several years, this traditional art is also used for entertainment. Its creator Singo came from Ponorogo. His original name was Mbah Singo Wulu, because of his ability to turn into a lion. At first glance, this art form looks similar to Barongsai, the lion dance, but the costumes and the equipment are quite simple. The players wear training pants and T-shirts, and the lion-shaped costume is made of rope.

History
The traditional dance was created by a respected man named Singo Wulu, who came from Ponorogo. He ran from Ponorogo to save himself and stayed in Blimbing village, Klabang district Bondowoso. Singo Wulu and his wife Nyi Moena with Ki Jasiman, were helping and cooperating to create a prosperous life of society at Blimbing village. He cared about the rice field and other people's daily needs. Many people were proud of him. That's why he was chosen to become the first village head of Blimbing village.

One day, he had an idea to create a public traditional dance called Singo Ulung played by two people. This dance is accompanied with particular music which makes the audience feel astonished. This art and Pojian art and Ojung art are always shown at the traditional ceremony of Bersih Desa Blimbing held every year in the month of Syaban / Ruwah). On the other hand, this art performance can be enjoyed in the annual moment of Hari Jadi Bondowoso precisely on 16 August.

Costume
Singo Ulung dancers have a different costume for each role. For the lion "Singo Ulung’s" dancer costume, two people wear the lion costume together, like in Barongsai. The difference between Barongsai and Singo Ulung is that normally Singo Ulung's costume is plain white and sometimes it's a mix of black and white, or yellow and white color. The material of the costume is raffia string decomposed until it looks like  fur. Panji and Jasiman wear a costume similar to Tari Topeng's. The female dancers wear traditional dress like kebaya and sampur as the accessories. The warok dancers wear all black with Madhure red-white shirt and bring cemethi as an attribute for their dancing.

Development
Singo ulung is a unique performance and it is attractive. Singo Ulung Art has become a tradition that is routinely performed in Blimbing village. A ritual village ceremony which performs the art performing of singo ulung traditionally. Research shows that the ritual village ceremony in Blimbing is conducted once a year, it is on 13-15 of the month of Sya’ban (it is believed as the existence of Blimbing Village). It is necessary to perform Singo Ulung in the ritual village ceremony, because it is considered as a main mean and it is not able to be replaced by others. In addition, Singo Ulung is also often featured in the anniversary event of Bondowoso. Singo Ulung dance is still being preserved and studied by several art galleries there. Besides the displays at the big event, the dance is also shown in other events such as welcoming guests and at festivals, in an effort to preserve and introduce to the public the traditional art from Bondowoso.

See also

 Sisingaan
 Barong
 Dance in Indonesia

References

External links
 Barongan Singo Ulung

Dances of Java
Dance in Indonesia
Indonesian folklore
Javanese folklore